The Eifel-Ardennes Green Route or Eifel-Ardennes Green Road is a cross-border, tourist route, about 500 kilometres long, which links the Ardennes to the Eifel. It runs from France via Belgium and Luxembourg to Germany mainly on quiet by-ways.

Course 
 France (ca. 90 km)
 Rethel - Attigny - Le Chesne - Sedan - Bazeilles
 Belgium (ca. 115 km)
 Bouillon - Cugnon - Mortehan - Auby-sur-Semois - Herbeumont - Florenville - Villers-devant-Orval - Habay-la-Neuve - Martelange
 Luxembourg (ca. 95 km)
 Esch-sur-Sûre - Wiltz - Clervaux - Hosingen - Diekirch - Vianden
 Germany (ca. 200 km)
 Roth an der Our - Sinspelt - Bitburg - Malberg - Kyllburg - Oberkail - Himmerod Abbey - Manderscheid - Weinfelder Maar - Schalkenmehrener Maar - Daun - Kelberg - Müllenbach - Kempenich - Bad Neuenahr-Ahrweiler - Bad Bodendorf - Sinzig

Sources 
 Eifelführer, Eifelverein e.V., 37. Auflage, 1995

Tourism in France
German tourist routes
Eifel
Ardennes